Burgsee may refer to:

Burgsee (Schwerin)
Burgsee (Schleswig)